William Davenport Hulbert (1868–1913) was an American naturalist and writer of fiction.

Career 
Born William Davenport Hulbert in Mackinac Island, Michigan and lived for a while on the upper peninsula in the Taquamenon River area.  He was privately educated and did not marry.  From 1895 until his death, he wrote short fiction for magazines.  White Pine Days on the Taquamenon is a collection of stories about lumbering, and was edited by his brother Richard C. Hulbert.

Bibliography

Fiction 
Life Saving on the Great Lakes
White Pine Days on the Taquamenon
Forest Neighbors; Life Stories of Wild Animals

References 
Michigan in Literature, p.92
The Flaming Sword, p.46
Who's Who in America 1906–1907, p.898

External links 
 
 
 

American male novelists
1868 births
1913 deaths
American naturalists
Novelists from Michigan
American male short story writers
19th-century American short story writers
20th-century American short story writers